Agua Tibia Wilderness (ATW) is a  protected area in Riverside and San Diego counties, in the U.S. state of California. It is mostly within the Palomar Ranger District of the Cleveland National Forest. The area was originally protected as the Agua Tibia Primitive Area until January 1975 when it was added to the National Wilderness Preservation System with the passage of Public Law 93-632 by the United States Congress. Between its inception and 1984, the ATW was San Diego County's only officially designated wilderness area. The Spanish name, Agua Tibia, translates as warm water.

Its approximate boundaries are:
 North – SR 79
 East – Arroyo Seco River
 South – Fray Creek
 West – Pala Road

Environment

There are no permanent streams in the ATW.

Though the summer climate is hot, with limited shade and no water sources, there were no fires in the ATW for 110 years.  In the last two decades, there have been four fires including the Palomar Mountain Fire (1987), the Vail Fire (1989), the Agua Tibia Fire (2000), and the Poomacha Fire (2007). Its pollution exposure is monitored within the San Diego Air Basin.

Flora
The Agua Tibia Wilderness is home to rare and endemic plants. These include:
 Nevin's barberry (Mahonia nevinii)
 Rainbow manzanita (Arctostaphylos rainbowensis)
 Round-leaved boykinia (Boykinia rotundifolia)
 Vail Lake ceanothus (Ceanothus ophiochilus)

Agua Tibia Research Natural Area
The Agua Tibia Research Natural Area (ATRNA), located within the wilderness, comprises  of bigcone Douglas-fir—canyon live oak forest. The area was set aside for the study of this forest type in the Peninsular Range province and with emphasis on forest succession, long-range ecological changes and the effects of resource management practices. Bigcone Douglas-fir (Pseudotsuga macrocarpa) is a relict species and is endemic to Southern California. This population on the ATRNA is unique for its relatively great age, size, genetic purity, placement near the southern extent of the species' range, and for its remoteness and lack of disturbance by man. Other notable plants in the research area are Laguna linanthus (Linanthus orcuttii ssp. pacificus) and Hall's monardella (Monardella macrantha ssp. hallii). Both are listed as 1B by the California Native Plant Society's Rare Plant Program.

References

External links
 USDA Forest Service official site
 Topo Map
 Land Management Plan Strategy
 Agua Tibia Wilderness

Wilderness areas of California
Cleveland National Forest
Protected areas of Riverside County, California
Protected areas of San Diego County, California
Natural history of the Peninsular Ranges
Protected areas established in 1975
1975 establishments in California